Robert "Bob" Donnorummo is the Senior Research Associate and Associate Director of the Center for Russian and East European Studies at the Center for International Studies at the University of Pittsburgh. His specialization is in Russian and Polish history, transitions, and nationalism. His recent publications have focused on the political and economic changes in Eastern Europe and the former Soviet Union.

References

External links
 Five Minutes With Bob Donnorummo, Pittsburgh Business Times, Friday, May 23, 2008

Living people
University of Pittsburgh faculty
Place of birth missing (living people)
Year of birth missing (living people)